Set point or setpoint may refer to:

 Set point (tennis), a tennis term meaning one player is one point away from winning a set
 Set point (endocrinology), a term encompassing a number of quantities (e.g. body weight, body temperature) where the endocrine system contributes to regulation and homeostasis.
 Setpoint (control system), the target value that an automatic control system, for example PID controller, will aim to reach
 Set point theory, a theory describing how the body maintains a consistent weight over time
 Set Point (album), the fourth studio album by Yolka